Mole Attack is a video game clone of the mechanical arcade game Whac-A-Mole. It was published by Commodore in 1981 for the VIC-20. HAL Laboratory  later published a version for the PC-8001.

Gameplay
Mole Attack is a game in which moles pop up from nine holes, and the player has 60 seconds to send them back underground by bopping them on the head with a hammer, which is controlled with the joystick or the keyboard.

Reception
In a 1983 review for Electronic Games, Charlene Komar commented, "Mole Attack will probably be a favorite among younger arcaders. Even though the eye-catching graphics combine well with the time-limit excitement, adults will probably find the game too simple and repetitive to get too many repeat plays."

References

External links
1984 Software Encyclopedia from Electronic Games
The official PasocomMini PC-8001 website  showing the list of included games which contains the PC-8001 version of Mole Attack

1981 video games
NEC PC-8001 games
VIC-20 games
Video game clones
Video games developed in the United States